NGHS may refer to:
 Napier Girls' High School, Napier, New Zealand
 Nasirabad Government High School,  Chittagong, Bangladesh
 Newport Girls High School, Newport, Shropshire, England
 North Garland High School, Garland, Texas, United States
 North Greene High School, Baileyton, Tennessee, United States
 North Gwinnett High School, Suwanee, Georgia, United States
 Northlands Girls' High School, Durban, KwaZulu-Natal, South Africa
 Northern Guilford High School, Greensboro, North Carolina, United States
 Northgate High School (Newnan, Georgia), United States